Vinalabeo tonkinensis is a species of fish in the family Cyprinidae native to the Red River basin in China and Vietnam. This species is the only member of its genus.

References

Cyprinid fish of Asia
Fish described in 1934
Labeoninae